Homoeosoma sinuella is a moth of the family Pyralidae. It is found in Europe.

The wingspan is 18–23 mm. The moths are on wing from May to August depending on the location.

The larvae feed on Plantago species.

References

External links
 UKMoths
 Lepidoptera of Belgium

Phycitini
Moths described in 1794
Moths of Europe
Insects of Turkey